The Ducati Sogno ("dream") was a half-frame 35 mm rangefinder camera made by Ducati in the 1950s at its Milan factory.  The Sogno has been called a "miniature Leica" referring to its size and build quality; it is considerably smaller than a Leica III.

The Sogno is unusual for having its controls, including the shutter release, operated by the left hand. It produces an 18 mm x 24 mm image on standard 35 mm film loaded in a special cassette provided with the camera.

References 
Citations

Sources

External links

Images of Sogno camera, accessories and 1950 manuals, as well as a Ducati Simplex camera, at Phil Aynsley Photography

Sogno
Rangefinder cameras